Larry Hinson (born August 5, 1944) is an American professional golfer who played on the PGA Tour from 1968–1976. 

Hinson was born in Gastonia, North Carolina, but has lived almost his entire life in Douglas, Georgia. Despite having a left arm slightly withered from boyhood polio, he was able to compete in amateur and professional golf. Hinson attended East Tennessee State University and was a member of the golf team. He was the individual medalist at the NCAA Division II Men's Golf Championships in 1967. 

Hinson had more than 30 top-10 finishes during his PGA Tour career including a win at the 1969 Greater New Orleans Open Invitational. In that tournament, he defeated Frank Beard on the third playoff hole. He finished the 1975 San Antonio Texas Open tied for first place in regulation play at 13-under-par 275; however, he lost in a playoff when Don January made a birdie on the second extra hole. His best finish in a major was a T-4 at the 1970 PGA Championship. Hinson was the recipient of the 1971 Ben Hogan Award.

Hinson is the general manager and head professional at Hinson Hills Golf Center in Douglas, Georgia, a family-run 18-hole par-3 course. He invented a device he calls the Stance Minder to help a golfer establish the proper set-up position.

Amateur wins
1967 NCAA Division II Championship

Professional wins (2)

PGA Tour wins (1)

PGA Tour playoff record (1–1)

Other wins (1)
1990 Dan J. Parrish Pro-Am Golf Classic

See also 

 Spring 1968 PGA Tour Qualifying School graduates

References

External links

American male golfers
East Tennessee State Buccaneers men's golfers
PGA Tour golfers
Golfers from North Carolina
Golfers from Georgia (U.S. state)
People from Gastonia, North Carolina
People from Douglas, Georgia
1944 births
Living people